Plutonaster is a genus of echinoderms belonging to the family Astropectinidae.

The genus has almost cosmopolitan distribution.

Species:

Plutonaster agassizi 
Plutonaster ambiguus 
Plutonaster bifrons 
Plutonaster complexus 
Plutonaster edwardsi 
Plutonaster efflorescens 
Plutonaster fragilis 
Plutonaster hikurangi 
Plutonaster intermedius 
Plutonaster jonathani 
Plutonaster keiensis 
Plutonaster knoxi 
Plutonaster sirius

References

Astropectinidae
Asteroidea genera